Kings Caple is a village in the largest loop of the River Wye between Hereford and Ross-on-Wye in the English county of Herefordshire. The population of the civil parish at the 2011 census was 331.

Buildings
King's Caple has a parish church of St John the Baptist, a primary school, and the small old school which now is used as a parish room.

Opposite the church there is an earthwork known as Caple Tump, reputed to be the remains of a castle motte.  The tump is round and now has trees growing on top. Legend has it that this was the site of village fairs in recent centuries.

Industry

King's Caple's main economic activity is agriculture, both traditional farming and fruit farming especially at Pennoxstone. At Aramstone there is also a large enterprise where race horses are trained.  There are various farms which are involved in the tourism industry both camping and caravanning as well as B & B and rented accommodation.

Poulstone Court, on the edge of the village, is a residential centre offering retreats and courses with a spiritual and personal growth focus.

Transport
King's Caple is linked to Hoarwithy by a road bridge, and to Sellack by an 1895 Louis Harper pedestrian suspension bridge. Until 1963 King's Caple was linked by the Hereford, Ross & Gloucester Railway to Hereford and Ross, and Fawley railway station was used daily by the local population.

References

External links

Poulstone Court

Villages in Herefordshire